Narendra Bagatheria (born 18 December 1950) is an Indian cricketer. He played in 46 first-class matches for Madhya Pradesh from 1969/70 to 1983/84.

See also
 List of Madhya Pradesh cricketers

References

External links
 

1950 births
Living people
Indian cricketers
Madhya Pradesh cricketers
Cricketers from Indore